Rockville Brass Band, formed in 1976, is one of the oldest competing British-style brass band in the US. It is located in Rockville, Maryland, and like other brass bands consists of cornets, alto horns, baritones, trombones, euphoniums, basses, and percussion. The group plays a repertoire in the British and American traditions, and is conducted by Rachel Zephir.

External links

American brass bands